para-Aminoblebbistatin is a water-soluble, non-fluorescent, photostable myosin II inhibitor, developed from blebbistatin. Among the several blebbistatin derivatives it is one of the most promising for research applications. Furthermore, it has a favourable overall profile considering inhibitory properties and ADME calculations.

Myosin specificity

References 

Anilines
Pyrroloquinolines
Acyloins
Tertiary alcohols